Fairfield Historic District may refer to:

Fairfield Historic District (Fairfield, Connecticut), listed on the NRHP in Connecticut
Fairfield Avenue Historic District (Bellevue, Kentucky), listed on the NRHP in Kentucky
Fairfield Historic District (Shreveport, Louisiana), listed on the NRHP in Louisiana
Fairfield Historic District (Fairfield, North Carolina), listed on the NRHP in North Carolina
Fairfield Historic District (Fairfield, Pennsylvania), listed on the NRHP in Pennsylvania